The Interdynamic MP-9 is a blowback-operated, fully automatic 9 mm caliber firearm, classified by BATF as a submachine gun. It is made of inexpensive molded polymer and stamped steel parts. Ten-, 20-, 32-, 36- and 50-round magazines are available.

The MP-9 came from a design that a Swedish company Interdynamic AB of Stockholm had for a cheap submachine gun for military applications. Interdynamic was unable to drum up any interest among governments, and the subgun never entered production in Sweden. Unwilling to give up on the design, Interdynamic set up a U.S. subsidiary intended principally to market a semiautomatic version, named the KG-9 after the two principal partners, Kelgren and Garcia, to civilians. More about Kelgren and Garcia can be found under Intratec TEC-9.

Interdynamic USA was forced by the ATF to redesign the KG-9 due to its ease of being converted to full auto.  At the same time as a closed bolt being designed, per the BATF, the lower plastic receiver had to be retooled to place a metal serial number tag in the side as opposed to just stamping the serial number in the plastic magazine well.  This version was named the KG-99 and it is this gun that was offered in an open bolt submachine gun configuration designated the MP-9.  Placed side by side, the KG-99 and MP-9 upper and lower receivers are identical with the exception that the MP-9 has a bolt hold open slot milled in the upper and the tip of the muzzle has a compensation slot cut into it. Interdynamic produced a very small quantity of registered MP-9 submachine guns due to lack of demand by the general public. The MP-9 was made in two configurations, one with select fire capability and a collapsible stock (Interdynamic MP-9), and one that is fully automatic only with no stock (K-9). Production numbers are believed to be less than 50 total, perhaps as few as 24 in select-fire with the collapsible stock. More information on this type of gun can be found here under Intratec TEC-DC9.

Imitation made illegally in Europe
Quantities of an illegally-made 9mm machine pistol have been seized in Europe. They are somewhat similar to the Intratec TEC-9, and are marked "Intratec TEC-9".

See also
 Intratec
 TEC-9
 Shipka
 Beretta M12
 Walther MP
 Spectre M4

References

External links 
 Interdynamic MP-9 manual

9mm Parabellum submachine guns
Submachine guns of Sweden